About Love may refer to:

"About Love" (short story), 1898 Russian short story by Anton Chekhov
About Love (album), 2009 album by the Plastiscines
"About Love" (song), a 2020 song by Marina
About Love (1970 film), a Soviet romantic drama film
About Love (2005 film), Taiwanese-Japanese-Chinese anthology film
 "About Love", 2019 Indian documentary by Archana Atul Phadke
 "About Love", a song by Red Velvet from Perfect Velvet
 About Love, an album by Gladys Knight & the Pips